The Lorraine 12F Courlis was a W-12 (broad arrow) aero engine introduced in France in 1929. It was not widely used.

Design and development

In 1926 Lorraine introduced a series of V-12 and W-12 engines with steel cylinders screwed into aluminium alloy engine blocks.

The 12F was officially homologated on 21 August 1929 and displayed at the 1930 Paris Salon. Unlike the 12E, which powered many different aircraft types, the 12F was not so widely used.

Variants
Lorraine 12Fa
Lorraine 12Fb
Lorraine 12Fd

Applications
Hanriot A.3 (1924 STAé specification ?)
I.A.R. CW-8
Nieuport-Delage NiD.540
Nieuport-Delage NiD.580
Nieuport-Delage NiD.623
Potez 50
SAB AB-20

Specifications (12Fa)

References

1920s aircraft piston engines
12F